Grey or gray is a neutral color between black and white.

Grey, greys,  gray, or grays may also refer to:

Places

Antarctica
 Cape Gray
 Grey Island (South Orkney Islands)

Australia
 Gray, Tasmania, a locality in Australia
 Grey, beach village near Cervantes, Western Australia
 Division of Grey, electoral district

Canada
 Grays Bay, Nunavut
 Grey County, Ontario
 Grey East former electoral district
 Grey North former electoral district
 Grey River, Newfoundland
 Grey—Simcoe former electoral district
 Grey South former electoral district
 Grey Southeast former electoral district
 Simcoe—Grey electoral district
 Wellington—Grey former electoral district
 West Grey, a municipality in Grey County, Ontario

New Zealand
 Grey District, New Zealand
 Grey River, New Zealand

United Kingdom
 Grays, Essex, a town in Essex, England
 Grays, Kent, a town in Kent, England
 Rotherfield Greys, a village and its parish in Oxfordshire, England

United States
 Gray, Georgia
 Gray, Iowa
 Gray, Kentucky
 Gray, Louisiana
 Gray, Maine, a New England town
 Gray (CDP), Maine, the main village in the town
 Gray, Tennessee
 Grays, Washington
 Gray Army Airfield in Tacoma, Washington

Elsewhere
 Grey Pond, Anguilla
 Gray, Haute-Saône, France
 Cape Gray, Greenland

People
 Gray (singer) (b. 1986), a South Korean hip hop recording artist and record producer
 Gray (surname)
 Grey (surname)
 CGP Grey, educational YouTuber, podcaster and streamer
 Gray Davis, former Governor of California
 Gray Dorsey, American law professor
 Gray Gaulding, American racing driver
 Grey DeLisle, American voice actress and singer-songwriter

Flora and fauna

Animals
 Gray (horse), sometimes mistaken for a white horse
 Gray langur, Hanuman langur
 Gray whale
 Gray wolf, native to the wilderness and remote areas of Eurasia and North America
 Grey peacock-pheasant, Burmese peacock
 Grey seal, found on both shores of the North Atlantic Ocean
 Grey parrot
 Hadena caesia, grey moth

Plants
 Kay Gray, grape

Arts, entertainment, and media

Fictional entities
 Grey, a character in the manga series Black Clover
 Gray, a DARPA operative in James Rollins' Sigma Force novels
 Gray Fullbuster, a character in the manga series Fairy Tail
 Gray Harkness, a character in the TV programme Torchwood
 Jean Grey, a character from Marvel Comics
 Lexie Grey, a character from Grey's Anatomy, often referred to as "Little Grey"
 Mark Gray, a character in the A Nightmare on Elm Street series
 Meredith Grey, a character from Grey's Anatomy, often referred to as "Grey"
 Nate Grey aka X-Man, an alternate reality son of Jean Grey
 Tina Gray, a character in the A Nightmare on Elm Street series
 Grey Vincent, one of the main characters in the anime series Battle B-Daman
 Emily Grey, a character in the machinima series Red Vs. Blue
 Grey, a character in Mega Man ZX Advent
 Alina Gray, a character in the RPG game, Magia Record
 Gray, a character in Xenoblade Chronicles 3

Music

Groups
 Gray (band), an American experimental band
 Grey (duo), an American electronic music duo

Albums
 Grey (album), a 1987 album by Sandy Lam

Songs
 "Grey", by the 69 Eyes from Paris Kills, 2002
 "Grey", by Ani DiFranco from Revelling/Reckoning, 2001
 "Grey", by BarlowGirl from Another Journal Entry, 2005
 "Grey", by Fireflight from Glam-rök, 2002
 "Grey", by Funeral for a Friend from Conduit, 2013
 "Grey", by LeToya Luckett from Back 2 Life, 2017
 "Grey", by Nasum from Inhale/Exhale, 1998
 "Grey", by Neurosis from Pain of Mind, 1987
 "Grey", by New Young Pony Club from Fantastic Playroom, 2007
 "Grey", by Paradise Lost from Paradise Lost, 2005
 "Grey", by Spineshank from Strictly Diesel, 1998
 "Grey", by Travis Scott from Days Before Rodeo, 2014
 "Grey", by Why Don't We from The Good Times and the Bad Ones, 2021
 "Grey", by Yellowcard from Lights and Sounds, 2006
 "Gray", by Demi Lovato from Dancing with the Devil... the Art of Starting Over, 2021
 "The Grey", by Thrice from Palms, 2018

Other arts, entertainment, and media
 Grey (manga), a Japanese comic
 Grey (novel), a 2015 book by E.L. James
 The Grey (film), a 2011 thriller film

Brands and enterprises
 Grey Global Group, an advertising agency founded in 1917
 Gray Light Car, an unsuccessful Colorado cyclecar from 1920
 Gray Marine Motor Company, a defunct American manufacturer that specialized in marine and automobile engines
Gray Television, an American publicly traded television broadcasting company based in Atlanta, Georgia

Military

Army
 Royal Scots Greys cavalry regiment of the British Army from 1707 to 1971
 The Grays, the Confederate States of America's armed forces

Navy
 USS Gray (FF-1054), a United States Navy frigate in commission from 1970 to 1991
 USS John P. Gray (APD-74), ex-DE-673, a United States Navy high-speed frigate in commission from 1944 to 1946

Sport
 Grays International, a UK-based sports company
 Grey Cup, a trophy awarded in the Canadian Football League
 Homestead Grays, Negro league baseball dynasty
 Louisville Grays, one of the original eight members of the National League
 Providence Grays, a Major League Baseball team that folded in 1885
 Providence Grays (minor league), the name of several minor league baseball teams between 1886 and 1949

Technology and science
 Gray (unit), the SI unit of energy for absorbed dose of radiation
 Gray code, an encoding method used to minimise bit change between adjacent values
 Grey box testing, a step in software development

Other uses
 Grey aliens, an alleged race of extraterrestrial aliens
 Grey College, Durham, a college of the University of Durham
 The Gray, another name for the Astral Plane or Spirit World

See also
 Justice Gray (disambiguation)
 The Grey (disambiguation)